Spanish Island is an island of Ireland in the Roaring Water Bay, north of Baltimore, County Cork.

References

See also
 List of islands of Ireland

Islands of County Cork